Bragdon-Lipe House is a historic home located at Canajoharie in Montgomery County, New York.  It was built about 1860 and is a two-story, timber-frame vernacular Italianate style residence.  The main block is nearly square and has a two-story kitchen and service wing in the rear.  It features an ornate two-story, polygonal wall bay and an enclosed square belevedere at the center of the roof.  Also on the property is a carriage barn dated to about 1870.

It was added to the National Register of Historic Places in 2005. It is located in the Canajoharie Historic District.

References

Houses on the National Register of Historic Places in New York (state)
Italianate architecture in New York (state)
Houses completed in 1860
Houses in Montgomery County, New York
National Register of Historic Places in Montgomery County, New York
Individually listed contributing properties to historic districts on the National Register in New York (state)